The 2022 European MTB Orienteering Championships was held from 18 to 22 May 2022 in Ignalina, Lithuania.

Medal summary

Medal table

Men

Women

Mixed

Participanting countries 
A total of 107 competitors and 14 officials from the national teams of the following 18 countries was registered to compete at 2022 European Championships

  (8)
  (11)
  (7)
  (10)
  (17)
  (7)
  (3)
  (2)
  (3)
  (4)
  (9)
  (3)
  (1)
  (1)
  (5)
  (8)
  (7)
  (1)

References

External links
Official website

Orienteering competitions
European MTB Orienteering Championships
International sports competitions hosted by Lithuania
MTB
Ignalina
European MTB Orienteering Championships